Pilgrim's Pride Corporation is an American, multi-national food company, currently one of the largest chicken producers in the United States and Puerto Rico and the second-largest chicken producer in Mexico.  It exited bankruptcy in December 2009 and relocated its U.S. headquarters to Greeley, Colorado, in 2011. It is majority-owned by JBS S.A. Pilgrim's Pride purchased Gold'n Plump for $350 million in late November 2016.

Description of firm
Pilgrim's Pride is a multi-national corporation, based in Brazil, and employs about 38,000 people with sales of $8.1 billion in 2012, and has operations in 12 states, Mexico and Puerto Rico.  They have the capacity to process about 36 million birds per week resulting in almost 9.5 billion pounds of live chicken annually.

Pilgrim's Pride products are distributed primarily through foodservice and retail outlets.

Pilgrim's traces its origins to a feed store opened in 1946 in Pittsburg, Texas, by Lonnie "Bo" Pilgrim and his older brother, Aubrey. They were known to give away free chicks with the bags of feed they sold, thereby expanding their business. Bo, wearing traditional Pilgrim clothing, with a pet chicken named "Henrietta" under his arm, was featured in Pilgrim's Pride advertisements. He became the president of the company after Aubrey died of a heart attack in 1966. Today, Pilgrim's Pride is vertically integrated, meaning the company has its own divisions for every process from "egg to table".

Pilgrim's Pride is a supplier of Kentucky Fried Chicken and was named its "supplier of the year" in 1997. Other customers include Walmart, Publix, and Wendy's. By 2012, Pilgrim's was the exclusive rotisserie chicken supplier for Costco, supplying 50 million 3-pound marinated chickens, ready to be placed into a rotisserie.

News events in the 2000s/2010s

On October 12, 2002, Pilgrim's Pride recalled 27.4 million pounds of sliced deli poultry after finding a strain of Listeria monocytogenes in the drain of one of their facilities. It was the largest food recall in the US at the time. The outbreak killed 7 people, sickened 46, and caused 3 miscarriages.

In 2003, Pilgrim's Pride acquired Pierce Chicken (formerly of ConAgra Foods and Hester Industries). Pierce Chicken is best known for its brand-name Wing Dings, Wing Zings, and various other prepared food products.

In May 2004, Pilgrim's Pride experienced an outbreak of avian influenza in Hopkins County in northeast Texas; 24,000 breeder hens were destroyed to contain the outbreak.

On July 20, 2004, PETA released a video showing cruelty to chickens at a Pilgrim's Pride plant in West Virginia.  The video showed Pilgrim Pride employees strangling, stomping, and flinging live chickens into a wall.  Pilgrim's Pride held an investigation, fired 11 employees, including managers, and has provided ongoing animal welfare training to its work force after KFC owner Yum Brands threatened to cease purchasing from the company following the incident; none of the employees faced any criminal charges.

Pilgrim's is also a supplier of cattle feed to various ranching operations in East Texas. The supply of cattle feed was criticized because of the alleged use of "inedible" chicken parts being used for protein content. This is a common practice in the poultry industry known as protein conversion, so as to profit from all parts of the bird. Protein conversion uses techniques to convert inedible parts of the animal, such as keratin in feathers and skin, into digestible protein to be used for livestock and pet food.

On December 4, 2006, Pilgrim's Pride announced the successful acquisition of Gold Kist (formerly the third largest chicken company) for $21.00 a share.  Although there was initial resistance from Gold Kist, the board members of both companies voted unanimously to combine the two companies.

On December 17, 2007, Pilgrim's Pride's CEO, O.B. Goolsby Jr., died after suffering a stroke while on a hunting trip in South Texas with customers.

On April 16, 2008, after a yearlong investigation US Immigration and Customs Enforcement raided plants in Batesville, Arkansas; Live Oak, Florida; Chattanooga, Tennessee; Mount Pleasant, Texas; and Moorefield, West Virginia. Officials arrested 311 foreign national employees on suspicion of identity theft. Of these, 91 have been formally charged.

On December 1, 2008, Pilgrim's Pride filed for bankruptcy.

On May 27, 2014, the company announced a $6.4 billion cash and debt offer to acquire all the shares in Hillshire Brands. A rival bid from Tyson Foods followed two days later. On June 9, 2014, the company announced it was withdrawing its bid for Hillshire after Tyson Foods had increased its offer to $8.55 billion.

On July 21, 2017, the company's co-founder, Lonnie "Bo" Pilgrim, died at the age of 89.

On September 23, 2020, Pilgrim's Pride announced the appointment of Fabio Sandri as CEO, replacing Jayson Penn. Penn went on leave in June following an indictment earlier this year on charges of price-fixing and bid-rigging.
In February 2021 Pilgrim's pride agrees to pay a $107 million fine on charges of bid rigging and price fixing.

Purchase by JBS S.A.

On September 17, 2009, JBS USA Holdings, Inc. announced the purchase of 64% of the shares of Pilgrim's Pride. JBS USA Holdings, Inc. is a subsidiary of Brazilian multinational JBS S.A., the largest meat processor in the world, and the largest by revenue. Currently JBS USA Holdings, Inc. owns 78.5% of the company.

As a result, Pilgrim's Pride closed its corporate offices in Texas and Georgia and moved its headquarters to Greeley, Colorado. This move caused the former headquarters in Pittsburg, Texas, and a location in nearby Mt. Pleasant, Texas, to cut employment by a total of 160 people. Other locations which lost jobs included sites in Atlanta, Dallas, and Broadway, Virginia.

COVID-19 pandemic

In late April, 2020, an outbreak of COVID-19 began at the Pilgrim's Pride plant in Lufkin, Texas. On May 8, a worker at the Lufkin plant was found dead in her home after being diagnosed with Covid-19. After the West Virginia National Guard conducted coronavirus tests of 520 (out of 940) workers at the Pilgrim's Pride plant in Moorefield, West Virginia, 18 workers tested positive. By May 11, 194 Covid-19 cases had been diagnosed among workers at the Pilgrim's Pride plant in Cold Spring, Minnesota, which employs about 1,100 workers. That same day, 75 to 85 cars filled with workers drove around the plant, honking horns and demanding over a loudspeaker that it be closed for two weeks. At least one worker has tested positive at the Pilgrim's Pride plant in Chattanooga, Tennessee, and other workers have tested positive at the company's plant in Timberville, Virginia, where dozens of workers protested in early April, although the company has declined to release the number of cases there.

References

External links

 Company website
 Pilgrim's Pride website (Archive)
 Pilgrim's Pierce Chicken division

JBS S.A. subsidiaries
Companies listed on the Nasdaq
American companies established in 1946
Food and drink companies established in 1946
Agriculture companies of the United States
Economy of Dallas
Companies based in Greeley, Colorado
Brand name poultry meats
Food recalls
Camp County, Texas
1946 establishments in Texas
Poultry companies
Meat processing in the United States
Meat companies of the United States
Companies that filed for Chapter 11 bankruptcy in 2008
American subsidiaries of foreign companies
2009 mergers and acquisitions
Meat packers